Nils von Rosenstein (1 December 1752 — 7 August 1824) was a Swedish civil servant and propagator for enlightenment thinking. He served as tutor to the future King Gustav IV Adolf for eleven years (1784–1795) and as the first permanent secretary of the Swedish Academy. He served as president of the Christian education society Pro Fide et Christianismo. He was the son of physician Professor Nils Rosén von Rosenstein.

Notes

Members of the Swedish Academy
Members of the Royal Swedish Academy of Sciences
1752 births
1824 deaths